Florham Park is a borough in Morris County, in the U.S. state of New Jersey. As of the 2020 United States census, the borough's population was 12,585, an increase of 889 (+7.6%) from the 2010 census count of 11,696, which in turn reflected an increase of 2,839 (+32.1%) from the 8,857 counted in the 2000 census.

Florham Park was incorporated as a borough by an act of the New Jersey Legislature on March 9, 1899, from portions of Chatham Township. In 2012, Forbes.com listed Florham Park as 440th in its listing of "America's Most Expensive ZIP Codes", with a median home price of $675,107. According to usa.com, from 2010–2014, the median home price was $612,400.

The National Football League's New York Jets relocated their main headquarters in 2008 to the Atlantic Health Jets Training Center, located in Florham Park.  The Jets relocated to Florham Park from their old facilities at Hofstra University in Hempstead, New York.  The team holds its day-to-day operations during the year in Florham Park, while relocating during July and August to Cortland, NY for training camp.  Florham Park beat out Berkeley Heights, Jersey City, Millburn, South Amboy, and Wood-Ridge, which had all been finalists contending to be the host of the new facility.

History

The area that is now Florham Park was first settled by the English sometime between 1680 and 1700, and the community was long recognized as a prime farming area. The area was known for the manufacture of quality brooms, which was the source of one of its town names, Broomtown. At various times during its history, the area was known as Hoppingtown, Broomtown, Columbia, Afton, and finally Florham Park. It was part of Hanover Township, then Chatham Township before being incorporated as Florham Park in 1899.

Florence Adele Vanderbilt Twombly (1854–1952), granddaughter of Cornelius Vanderbilt, renowned as the richest man in America, and her husband, financier, Hamilton McKown Twombly, came to the Morris County countryside in 1887, joining over 100 other millionaires who owned sprawling country retreats. They fancied an English-style country mansion in a stately park setting. The couple named their new estate "Florham," a combination of their first names, Florence and Hamilton. Owned by Dr. Leslie Ward—one of the founders of the Prudential Insurance Company and the first vice president of the company—it was named "Brooklake Park", partially because of the beautiful lake that was on the property.

Both of these families were supporters of many civic projects including the petitioning of the State of New Jersey to create their own municipality. After the legislature voted on March 9, 1899, the governor signed the bill on March 20, making Florham Park a borough. The new town was named after Florence and Hamilton Twombly's and Dr. Ward's estates.

Geography
According to the United States Census Bureau, the borough had a total area of 7.48 square miles (19.36 km2), including 7.31 square miles (18.93 km2) of land and 0.17 square miles (0.43 km2) of water (2.23%).

Unincorporated communities, localities and place names located partially or completely within the borough include Columbia Ridge.

The Borough is located in southeastern Morris County and is bordered to the south by Madison and Chatham Boroughs; to the north by Hanover and East Hanover Townships; to the west by Morris Township; and on the east by the Passaic River where it borders Essex County communities Livingston and Millburn Townships.

Demographics

2010 census

The Census Bureau's 2006–2010 American Community Survey showed that (in 2010 inflation-adjusted dollars) median household income was $106,227 (with a margin of error of +/− $10,030) and the median family income was $121,316 (+/− $8,544). Males had a median income of $92,857 (+/− $17,466) versus $61,331 (+/− $12,613) for females. The per capita income for the borough was $46,564 (+/− $4,867). About 0.5% of families and 2.2% of the population were below the poverty line, including 0.7% of those under age 18 and 7.7% of those age 65 or over.

2000 census
As of the 2000 United States census there were 8,857 people, 3,239 households, and 2,474 families residing in the borough. The population density was 1,191.3 people per square mile (460.3/km2). There were 3,342 housing units at an average density of 449.5 per square mile (173.7/km2). The racial makeup of the borough was 94.00% White, 0.99% African American, 0.01% Native American, 3.87% Asian, 0.06% Pacific Islander, 0.38% from other races, and 0.68% from two or more races. Hispanic or Latino of any race were 2.15% of the population.

There were 3,239 households, out of which 30.8% had children under the age of 18 living with them, 66.7% were married couples living together, 7.3% had a female householder with no husband present, and 23.6% were non-families. 20.7% of all households were made up of individuals, and 10.0% had someone living alone who was 65 years of age or older. The average household size was 2.62 and the average family size was 3.05.

In the borough the population was spread out, with 21.7% under the age of 18, 5.0% from 18 to 24, 25.2% from 25 to 44, 27.7% from 45 to 64, and 20.4% who were 65 years of age or older. The median age was 44 years. For every 100 females, there were 86.0 males. For every 100 females age 18 and over, there were 80.6 males.

The median income for a household in the borough was $88,706, and the median income for a family was $102,047. Males had a median income of $74,410 versus $49,551 for females. The per capita income for the borough was $42,133. About 2.4% of families and 5.8% of the population were below the poverty line, including 3.8% of those under age 18 and 11.9% of those age 65 or over.

Economy
Florham Park is the North American headquarters of the BASF corporation, the world's largest chemical company. Nickel alloys producer VDM Metals USA (formerly operating under the name of ThyssenKrupp VDM USA and Precision Rolled Products) operates a melting plant in Florham Park. Business process services company Conduent is based in Florham Park.

Government

Local government
Florham Park is governed under the Borough form of New Jersey municipal government, which is used in 218 municipalities (of the 564) statewide, making it the most common form of government in New Jersey. The governing body is comprised of the Mayor and the Borough Council, with all positions elected at-large on a partisan basis as part of the November general election. The Mayor is elected directly by the voters to a four-year term of office. The Borough Council is comprised of six members elected to serve three-year terms on a staggered basis, with two seats coming up for election each year in a three-year cycle. The borough form of government used by Florham Park, the most common system used in the state, is a "weak mayor / strong council" government in which council members act as the legislative body, with the mayor presiding at meetings and voting only in the event of a tie. The mayor can veto ordinances subject to an override by a two-thirds majority vote of the council. The mayor makes committee and liaison assignments for council members, and most appointments are made by the mayor with the advice and consent of the council.

, the mayor of Florham Park is Republican Mark Taylor, serving a term of office ending on December 31, 2023. Members of the borough council are Council President Scott Carpenter (R, 2024), Charles A. Germershausen (R, 2023), Charles J. Malone Jr. (R, 2023), Joshua I. Marchal (R,2024), Kristen Santoro (R, 2022) and William L. Zuckerman (R, 2022).

In May 2013, the borough council chose Council President Mark Taylor from a list of three candidates nominated by the Republican municipal committee to fill the vacant mayoral seat of R. Scott Eveland, who had resigned from office in March from a term expiring in December 2015. At the same meeting, the council selected Thomas Michalowski from the list of three candidates nominated to fill the vacant council seat of David Wikstrom, who had resigned in April from a term expiring in December 2013. In April 2013, the council chose William Zuckerman from the list of three nominees to fill Mark Taylor's vacant council seat expiring in December 2016.

Federal, state and county representation
Florham Park is located in the 11th Congressional District and is part of New Jersey's 27th state legislative district. Prior to the 2011 reapportionment following the 2010 Census, Florham Park had been in the 26th state legislative district.

 

Morris County is governed by a Board of County Commissioners comprised of seven members who are elected at-large in partisan elections to three-year terms on a staggered basis, with either one or three seats up for election each year as part of the November general election. Actual day-to-day operation of departments is supervised by County Administrator, John Bonanni. , Morris County's Commissioners are
Commissioner Director Tayfun Selen (R, Chatham Township, term as commissioner ends December 31, 2023; term as director ends 2022),
Commissioner Deputy Director John Krickus (R, Washington Township, term as commissioner ends 2024; term as deputy director ends 2022),
Douglas Cabana (R, Boonton Township, 2022), 
Kathryn A. DeFillippo (R, Roxbury, 2022),
Thomas J. Mastrangelo (R, Montville, 2022),
Stephen H. Shaw (R, Mountain Lakes, 2024) and
Deborah Smith (R, Denville, 2024).
The county's constitutional officers are the County Clerk and County Surrogate (both elected for five-year terms of office) and the County Sheriff (elected for a three-year term). , they are 
County Clerk Ann F. Grossi (R, Parsippany–Troy Hills, 2023),
Sheriff James M. Gannon (R, Boonton Township, 2022) and
Surrogate Heather Darling (R, Roxbury, 2024).

Politics
As of March 2011, there were a total of 7,111 registered voters in Florham Park, of which 1,319 (18.5%) were registered as Democrats, 3,035 (42.7%) were registered as Republicans and 2,756 (38.8%) were registered as Unaffiliated. There was one voter registered to another party.

In the 2020 presidential election, Republican Donald Trump received 50% of the vote (3,549 cast), slightly ahead of Democrat Joseph Biden with 49% (3,457 cast), and other candidates with 1% (67 votes). In the 2016 presidential election, Republican Donald Trump received 53.9% of the vote (3,175 cast), ahead of Democrat Hillary Rodham Clinton with 43.2% (2,548 cast), and other candidates with 2.8% (170 votes). In the 2012 presidential election, Republican Mitt Romney received 59.8% of the vote (3,273 cast), ahead of Democrat Barack Obama with 39.5% (2,165 votes), and other candidates with 0.7% (38 votes), among the 5,511 ballots cast by the borough's 7,810 registered voters (35 ballots were spoiled), for a turnout of 70.6%. In the 2008 presidential election, Republican John McCain received 59.2% of the vote (3,384 cast), ahead of Democrat Barack Obama with 39.7% (2,270 votes) and other candidates with 0.7% (39 votes), among the 5,716 ballots cast by the borough's 7,330 registered voters, for a turnout of 78.0%. In the 2004 presidential election, Republican George W. Bush received 61.4% of the vote (3,382 ballots cast), outpolling Democrat John Kerry with 37.8% (2,082 votes) and other candidates with 0.4% (28 votes), among the 5,509 ballots cast by the borough's 7,176 registered voters, for a turnout percentage of 76.8.

In the 2013 gubernatorial election, Republican Chris Christie received 73.6% of the vote (2,674 cast), ahead of Democrat Barbara Buono with 25.5% (927 votes), and other candidates with 0.9% (34 votes), among the 3,713 ballots cast by the borough's 7,664 registered voters (78 ballots were spoiled), for a turnout of 48.4%. In the 2009 gubernatorial election, Republican Chris Christie received 61.7% of the vote (2,410 ballots cast), ahead of  Democrat Jon Corzine with 29.6% (1,155 votes), Independent Chris Daggett with 7.8% (304 votes) and other candidates with 0.1% (5 votes), among the 3,903 ballots cast by the borough's 7,118 registered voters, yielding a 54.8% turnout.

Education

The Florham Park School District serves public school students in pre-kindergarten through eighth grade. As of the 2018–19 school year, the district, comprised of three schools, had an enrollment of 994 students and 92.2 classroom teachers (on an FTE basis), for a student–teacher ratio of 10.8:1. The schools in the district (with 2018–19 school enrollment data from the National Center for Education Statistics) are:
Briarwood Elementary School with 358 students in grades Pre-K–2, 
Brooklake Elementary School with 313 students in grades 3–5 and 
Ridgedale Middle School with 319 students in grades 6–8.

Students in public school for ninth through twelfth grades are served by the Hanover Park Regional High School District, attending Hanover Park High School together with students from East Hanover Township, where the school is located. The district also serves students from the neighboring community of Hanover Township at Whippany Park High School in the Whippany section of Hanover Township. As of the 2018–2019 school year, the high school had an enrollment of 839 students and 76.6 classroom teachers (on an FTE basis), for a student–teacher ratio of 11.0:1. The seats on the district's nine-member board of education are allocated to the constituent municipalities based on population, with Florham Park assigned three seats.

Holy Family School is a Catholic school operated under the auspices of the Roman Catholic Diocese of Paterson. The school opened in 1954 with 173 students and reached a peak enrollment of 700 in the 1960s.

Portions of the College of Saint Elizabeth campus are in Florham Park, including the Villa of Saint Ann, a classical Greek amphitheater built into a hillside, and the original dairy farm for the complex. Portions of the Fairleigh Dickinson University's Florham Campus, also are located in Florham Park.

Transportation

Roads and highways

New Jersey Route 24 is the most prominent highway directly serving Florham Park. There is one interchange partially within the borough, Exit 2 (County Route 510), which also passes through the borough.

Public transportation
NJ Transit provides bus service from the borough to Newark on the 70 and 73 routes, with local service on routes 878 and 879. Service had been offered on the MCM8 route, which was suspended in 2010 after subsidies to the contract provider were eliminated as part of NJ Transit budget cuts.

Notable people

People who were born in, residents of, or otherwise closely associated with Florham Park include:

 Kary Antholis (born 1962), Academy Award-winning documentary filmmaker
 Tiki Barber (born 1975), former professional football who played for the New York Giants
 Salvatore A. Bontempo (1909–1989), politician who served as chairman of the New Jersey Democratic State Committee
 William Consovoy (1974–2023), attorney for conservative causes
 John T. Cunningham (1915–2012), New Jersey's popular historian
 Eric Duncan (born 1984), former professional baseball player
 Mark Guiliana (born 1980), drummer, composer, and leader of the band Beat Music
 Johan Hedberg (born 1973), former NHL goaltender
 Ralph A. Loveys (1929–2017), politician who was elected to three terms in the New Jersey General Assembly, where he represented the 26th Legislative District
 Archie Moore (born 1940), MLB player who appeared in 40 games for the New York Yankees in 1964 and 1965
 Bill Raftery (born 1943), basketball analyst and former college basketball coach
 Lange Schermerhorn (born 1939), career foreign service officer who served as United States Ambassador to Djibouti from December 1997 until November 2000
 Tony Siragusa (1967-2022), former football player with the Indianapolis Colts and Baltimore Ravens
 Snooki (born 1987), reality TV personality from the shows Jersey Shore and Snooki & Jwoww
 Florence Adele Vanderbilt Twombly (1854–1952), heiress and a member of the Vanderbilt family
 Hamilton McKown Twombly (1849–1910), businessman
 Spencer Weisz (born 1995), American-Israeli professional basketball player for Hapoel Haifa of the Israeli Basketball Premier League

References

External links

 Florham Park Borough website
 Florham Park School District
 
 School Data for the Florham Park School District, National Center for Education Statistics
 Hanover Park Regional High School District
 Hanover Park High School
 Florham Park Eagle newspaper
 Daily Record regional area newspaper
 Fourth of July Parade
 Florham Park Gazebo Concert Series

 
1899 establishments in New Jersey
Borough form of New Jersey government
Boroughs in Morris County, New Jersey
Populated places established in 1899